The 1937 Temple Owls football team was an American football team that represented Temple University as an independent during the 1937 college football season. In its fifth season under head coach Pop Warner, the team compiled a 3–2–4 record and was outscored by a total of 59 to 38. The team played its home games at Temple Stadium in Philadelphia.

Schedule

References

Temple
Temple Owls football seasons
Temple Owls football